Britannia Community Secondary School is a public community secondary school located in the Grandview–Woodland neighbourhood on the east-side of Vancouver, British Columbia. The school educates its students using a district-wide block schedule program that alternates four blocks every two days. Students are subject to eight different blocks in total.

The school was founded in 1908 as the second high school to be constructed in the city, and is now the oldest remaining secondary school. The first classes were held in the Admiral Seymour Elementary School building in September 1908. The school moved to the then partially completed Britannia building in 1910. The school colours of red, green, and white and the school motto "Per Vias Rectas" were adopted at this time. During the 1966-67 school year, a new wing was constructed and now houses the school office. In 1974, Britannia Secondary became Britannia Elementary-Secondary School. Britannia celebrated its centennial in 2008.

Situated in the Commercial Drive area of Vancouver, Britannia is a part of a larger community site which includes an elementary school, public library, skating rink, fitness facility and swimming pool. Britannia is also host to many other programs in academics, fine arts, leadership and academic tutoring and support. Nearly 200 courses are offered at the school including 19 International Baccalaureate (IB) Diploma Programme courses and a Hockey Canada Skills Academy. Britannia athletic teams compete in the Vancouver Secondary School Athletics Association as part of BC School Sports and are known as the Bruins. Notable Britannia alumni include an Order of Canada recipient, a former Premier of British Columbia, and a former Supreme Court of Canada justice.

History

Britannia, the second high school to be constructed in Vancouver is now the oldest remaining secondary school. The first classes were held in the Admiral Seymour building in September, 1908. The school moved to the then partially completed Britannia building in 1910. The school colours of red, green, and white and the school motto "Per Vias Rectas", which means "straight forward", were adopted at this time.

In September 1955, the gymnasium and cafeteria were added to the 'old building'. It was also at this time that Grades 8 and 9 students were first admitted for enrolment. During the 1966-67 school year, a new wing was constructed providing additional Science, Technology Education, Home Economics, and Business Education classrooms. The new wing now also houses the school office. The new wing was connected to the old building by a walkway which most students call "the Skywalk."

In 1974, Britannia Secondary became Britannia Elementary-Secondary School. The elementary section opened its doors on January 9, 1975 to 16 staff and 370 students making a combined student enrollment of approximately 1800. This was also the year of incorporation of the Britannia Community Center Society and the year that Britannia became a community school. Britannia celebrated its centennial in 2008. Britannia alumni assisted in the planning of the celebration.

Enriched courses
Britannia offers an International Baccalaureate (IB) Diploma Programme for grades 11–12 and a Venture program for grades 8–10. Britannia and Sir Winston Churchill Secondary School are the only two public secondary schools in Vancouver to offer the programme. The programme offers some course content which is at the first-year university level.

The Venture program, which is based on the mini school concept, prepares students intending to enter IB in grade 11 to gain leadership skills, develop teamwork and offers a more enriching educational experience than regular classes.

Alternative programs
Britannia offers many alternative programs including the Britannia Hockey Academy, which was the first sport-focused academy in the Vancouver school system, and is licensed by the Hockey Canada Skills Academy. Other alternative programs in Britannia are for some students with academic difficulty, and/or have a first nations heritage.

Facilities
Britannia Secondary is unique in having community centre facilities within the complex. The school is situated on a  site. The Britannia Community Centre boasts an ice rink, swimming pool, several gyms, a weight room and fitness centre, and Britannia Secondary students often use these facilities in physical education classes and in extracurricular activities.

Britannia also has a library within the community centre that is a Vancouver Public Library. Despite this, britannia added a library to the third floor of the building and students are encouraged to use this instead of the public library. However, students can still use the public library if they have a library card.

Demographics
The Britannia student body comes from a catchment area that includes the neighbourhoods of Strathcona, the Downtown Eastside, and most of Grandview–Woodland. Their area has the highest concentration of Canadian Aboriginal in Vancouver. The Britannia student body also include those from outside the catchment area, as well as outside the district through open enrolment. In 2010, the school had a student body of 748 students in grades 8–12. 28% of the Britannia student population are Canadian Aboriginal, while 4% are ESL students and 2% are non-residents. The school has a student population with at least 38 different languages spoken including Cantonese, Vietnamese, Mandarin and Tagalog. Approximately 30% of Britannia students live in households that receive income assistance or have marginal cost of funds, and 26% of students were identified as having special needs. The school has the lowest Fraser Institute rating with a 3.0/10, the lowest of Vancouver School Board secondary schools. The Britannia graduation rate is 92%.

Alec MacInnes serves as principal, a position he has held since 2019, with Karen Blake and Krista Ediger as vice principals. The staff consists of 3 administrators, 53 full and part-time teachers and 26 support staff members. The school as an average class size of 22.9, which is lower than the district average class size of 24.8.

Athletics

Britannia is predominately an AA school in terms of athletics according to the BC School Sports. The school had a dominant football team in the 1970s, winning the Shrine Bowl Provincial Championships once, and being runners-up three times. In 1974, Britannia hosted their first basketball tournament called the Bruin Invitational Basketball Tournament.  Since then, the tournament is hosted annually and it has been a great success to Britannia.

On March 8, 2008, The Britannia Senior Boys Basketball team won the British Columbia AA Provincial Basketball Tournament by beating the Windsor Dukes 81-73. That was the first time any public school from East Vancouver has won a B.C. boys senior high basketball title.  The next season, Britannia's senior boys team made the 'AA' Provincial final again, but lost to Southern Okanagan Secondary School from Oliver. The following 2010 basketball season saw the Britannia Senior Boys Basketball team return to the AA Provincial Basketball final and defeated the basketball team from RC Palmer Secondary to reclaim the title of AA Provincial Champion.

On March 10, 2012, the Britannia Senior Girls Basketball team also made school history by capturing its first B.C. girls basketball title after a silver medal finish the year before in 2011.  Britannia's senior girls team beat Lambrick Park 69-61 in the AA Provincial basketball final after a fourth quarter surge that saw the Bruins outscore the Pride 21-4.  This tops an incredible feat that has 5 consecutive Britannia basketball teams medal at the AA Provincial Championships since 2008.

Britannia has teams for badminton, basketball, cross country, soccer, table tennis, track and field, ultimate frisbee, and volleyball.

Notable alumni

Britannia has produced Premiers, Supreme Court Justices and philanthropists over its 102-year history. Notably, in the past three years, Britannia has produced two Loran Scholars (the largest undergraduate scholarship in Canada, at $80,000), one TD Canada Trust Scholarship recipient ($70,000), and over twenty Beedie Luminaries Scholars ($40,000), the most of any secondary school in Canada.

References

External links
 Britannia Secondary
 Vancouver School Board—Britannia Secondary
 History of Britannia Secondary
 Britannia Community Centre
 Britannia Centennial

School Reports: Ministry of Education
 Class Size
 Student Statistics
 Provincial Required Examinations
 Provincial Optional Examinations
 Grade-to-Grade Transitions
 Graduation Rates
 Satisfaction Survey

International Baccalaureate schools in British Columbia
High schools in Vancouver
Educational institutions established in 1908
1908 establishments in British Columbia